iTunes Originals – Alanis Morissette is a digital compilation album of Alanis Morissette songs released by iTunes in 2004. Twenty-one tracks were included in the download, with some tracks featuring Morissette's thoughts about her songs. Original performances were also released on this album exclusive to iTunes.

Track listing
"Introduction" - 1:42 
"Thoughts About "You Oughta Know" " - 0:52 
"You Oughta Know"- 4:09 
"The Motivation Behind Writing "Everything" " - 2:37 
"Everything" (iTunes Originals version) - 4:34 
"How the Inspiration Behind "Everything" is similar to "Head over Feet"" - 0:46 
"Head over Feet" (iTunes Originals version) - 4:20 
"The Most Ironic Thing About "Ironic""- 0:51 
"Ironic"( iTunes Originals version) - 3:55 
"How to Ruin Your Life in "Eight Easy Steps"" - 0:37 
"Eight Easy Steps"- 2:50 
""Thank U" Is a Prayer" - 0:54 
"Thank U" (iTunes Originals version) - 4:36 
"Finding "Excuses" " - 0:45 
"Excuses" (iTunes Originals version) - 3:56 
"The Therapy Behind "Hands Clean" " - 0:55 
"Hands Clean" (iTunes Originals version) - 4:44 
"The Most gratifying Moments for Me" - 0:48 
"Utopia"- 4:58 
"Why the Album Is Called "So-Called Chaos"" - 1:15 
"Out Is Through"- 3:52

References 

Alanis Morissette albums
Morissette, Alanis
2004 compilation albums
Maverick Records compilation albums